Kristjan Kaljurand (born 13 July 1992) is an Estonian male badminton player.

Achievements

BWF International Challenge/Series

Men's Doubles

Mixed Doubles

 BWF International Challenge tournament
 BWF International Series tournament
 BWF Future Series tournament

Personal life
Kaljurand's mother is Estonian diplomat and politician Marina Kaljurand.

References

External links
 

1992 births
Living people
Sportspeople from Tallinn
Estonian people of Russian descent
Estonian people of Latvian descent
Estonian male badminton players
European Games competitors for Estonia
Badminton players at the 2019 European Games